This article represents a list of all past members of the bluegrass group Country Gentlemen.

this page also redirects from Glen Duncan https://en.wikipedia.org/wiki/Glenn_Duncan?action=edit

who is not on this page;

Founding members
Founding members of Country Gentlemen in 1957 were:
 Charlie Waller - vocals, guitar
 Bill Emerson - banjo, vocals
 John Duffey - mandolin, vocals
 Larry Lahey - bass

The most famous are two other lineups of the Country Gentlemen, usually called 1st Classic and 2nd Classic Lineup.

1st Classic lineup: 1960 - 1964
 Charlie Waller - vocals, guitar
 Eddie Adcock - banjo, vocals
 John Duffey - mandolin, vocals
 Tom Gray - bass, vocals

Members of this lineup were inducted into the International Bluegrass Music Hall of Honor in 1996.

2nd Classic lineup: 1972 - 1973
 Charlie Waller - vocals, guitar
 Bill Emerson - banjo, vocals
 Doyle Lawson - mandolin, vocals
 Bill Yates - bass, vocals

List of all past members by instrument

Guitar

Founding member (and the only one who was with the group from the beginning until the end), Charlie Waller played exclusively the acoustic guitar. There were other members of the group, who contributed with guitar playing from time to time, especially for the songs where banjo was omitted, or when the group needed to overdub an extra acoustic guitar.

 Charlie Waller (1957-2004)
 Pete Kuykendall (1958-1959)
 Randy Waller
 John Duffey
 Eddie Adcock
 Darin Aldridge
 Kenny Smith
 Billy Rose
 Gene Woten
 Jimmy Gaudreau
 Kent Dowell

Mandolin
 John Duffey (1957–69)
 Jimmy Gaudreau (1969-1972, 1981-1983)
 Doyle Lawson (1972-1979)
 Rick Allred (1979-1981)
 Jimmy Bowen (1983-1995)
 Darin Aldridge (1995-2004)
 Randall Hylton
 Jeff Davis
 Tim Finch
 David Kirk
 Norman Wright
 Dwight McCall

5-string banjo
 Bill Emerson (1957-1958, 1970-1973)
 Pete Kuykendall (1958-1959)
 Porter Church (June/July 1959)
 Eddie Adcock (1959-1970)
 Walter Hensley (September 1961)
 James Bailey (1974, 1976-1979, 1986-1988)
 Mike Davis (1981-1986)
 Doyle Lawson (1974)
 Mike Lilly (1973-1974)
 Bill Holden (1974-1976) 
 Kent Dowell (1979-1981)
 Dick Smith (1981-1988)
 Keith Little (1988)
 Kevin Church (1988-1990)
 Billy Rose (1990-1991)
 Greg Corbett (1991-2004)
 Mark Delaney 
 Adam Poindexter

Acoustic bass
There were number of different bassist during almost five decades of lasting of the band. Tom Gray and Bill Yates were the most prominent ones, the latter spent almost 20 years with the group.

 Larry Lahey (1957)
 Tom Morgan (1958)
 Jim Cox (1958-1960)
 Tom Gray (1960–64)
 Ed Ferris (1964–69)
 Ed McGlothlin (1969)
 Bill Yates (1970-1990)
 Jimmy Bowen (1990-1995)
 Ronnie Davis (1995-2004)
 Matthew Allred
 Tim Ashley
 Steve Block
 Gary Creed
 Stoney Edwards
 Billy Gee
 Spider Gilliam
 Sonny Johnson
 Billy Rose
 Roy Self
 Lester Deaton - bass
 Gene Wooten
 Jimmy Gaudreau

Dobro
The Country Gentlemen used Dobro later on in their career - starting in 1973. Jerry Douglas and Mike Auldridge can be considered as the most prominent players on this instrument.

 Jerry Douglas (1973–74, 1975, 1978)
 Mike Auldridge
 John Duffey
 Brian Blaylock
 Kenny Haddock
 Rob Ickes (2004)
 Gene Wooten
 Kim Gardmer
 Carl Nelson
 Steve Wilson

Fiddle
The Country Gentlemen used fiddle occasionally on some of their recordings and during some concerts. Ricky Skaggs was the most notable fiddle player for the group.

 Ricky Skaggs
 John Hall
 Carl Nelson
 Greg Luck
 Glenn Duncan (1992)
 Tim Smith (1995)

Timeline

References

Country Gentlemen members